In computer science, a generalized suffix array (or GSA) is a suffix array containing all suffixes for a set of strings. It is primarily used in bioinformatics and string processing.

Functionality 

The functionality of a generalized suffix array is as follows:
 For a collection or set of strings, .
 It is a lexicographically sorted array of all suffixes of each string in the set .
 In the case where different strings in  have identical suffixes, in the generalized suffix array, those suffixes will occupy consecutive positions. However, for convenience, the exception can be made where repeats will not be listed.

A generalized suffix array can be generated for a generalized suffix tree. When compared to a generalized suffix tree, while the generalized suffix array will require more time to construct, it will use less space than the tree.

Construction Algorithms and Implementations 

Algorithms and tools for constructing a generalized suffix array include:
This includes sorting, searching and finding the longest common prefixes.
 The external generalized enhanced suffix array, or eGSA, construction algorithm which specializes in external memory construction, is particularly useful when the size of the input collection or data structure is larger than the amount of available internal memory
 gsufsort is an open-source, fast, portable and lightweight tool for the construction of generalized suffix arrays and related data structures like Burrows–Wheeler transform or LCP Array)
 Mnemonist, a collection of data structures implemented in JavaScript contains an implementation for a generalized suffix tree and can be found publicly on npm and GitHub.

Solving the Pattern Matching Problem 

Generalized suffix arrays can be used to solve the pattern matching problem:
Particularly important, since  is sorted, it makes identification of suffixes possible and easy using binary search.
 Using binary search, first find the smallest index  in  such that  contains  as a prefix, or determine that no such suffix is present. Otherwise, find the largest index  which contains  as a prefix.
 Binary search on  takes  comparisons.  is compared with a suffix to determine their lexicographic order in each comparison that is done. Thus, this requires comparing at most  characters. Note that a  array is not required, but will offer the benefit of a lower running time.

By comparison, solving this problem using suffix trees takes  time. Note that with a generalized suffix array, the space required is smaller compared to a suffix tree, since the algorithm only requires space for  words and the space to store the string.

Other Applications 
 A generalized suffix array can be utilized to compute the longest common subsequence of all the strings in a set or collection.
 A generalized suffix array can be utilized to find the longest previous factor array, a concept central to text compression techniques and in the detection of motifs and repeats

See also 
 Suffix Tree
 Suffix Array
 Generalized Suffix Tree
 Pattern matching problem
 Bioinformatics

References

External links
Generalized enhanced suffix array construction in external memory

Arrays
Computer science suffixes
Substring indices